Juan Pablo Di Pace (born 25 July 1979) is an Argentine actor and singer. He began his career in the United Kingdom, performing in a number of musicals and appearing in films like Survival Island (2005) and Mamma Mia! (2008). He later moved to Spain, starring in several television series from 2009 to 2013. In 2014, Di Pace began starring as Nicolas Treviño in the TNT drama series Dallas. From 2016 to 2020, he played the role of Kimmy Gibbler's estranged husband, Fernando, on Fuller House, a spin-off series of Full House.

Early life and education 
Di Pace was born in Buenos Aires, Argentina, and moved to Spain when he was twelve. He was raised Catholic. He lived in London for ten years. He speaks fluent Spanish, Italian and English. At age 17, he was awarded a scholarship to attend the United World College of the Adriatic in Duino, Trieste, Italy, and later studied theatre at the London Studio Centre.

Career
Prior to joining the big screen, Di Pace appeared in the London musical Chicago and fronted posters for the production shown all over the United Kingdom. He also played the role of Danny Zuko in the Trieste production of Grease in Italy, partly directed by Di Pace. For two years, he was Tony Manero in the 2009–2010 Spanish production of Saturday Night Fever in Madrid, produced by Stage Entertainment, which won him critical acclaim by the European press. In 2011-12 he starred in the original Spanish production of Más de cien mentiras produced by Drive Entertainment.

Di Pace has made several appearances on British television, such as the BBC One comedy The Catherine Tate Show,  BBC One film Aftersun, BBC One series New Tricks and BBC Scotland soap River City, which he joined in 2005 playing the character of Luca Rossi. His on-screen debut was in the 2005 film Survival Island. He is also featured in Mamma Mia! (2008).

Upon moving to Spain he played regular roles in TV series such as Supercharly, Angel o Demonio, Los Hombres de Paco, 90-60-90, and El Don de Alba. In 2011 he starred in the final season of Física o Química,. Di Pace also starred in the video for the 2004 Eric Prydz hit "Call On Me". In the video, he is the only man amongst a group of women in an aerobics class. He also directed and starred in the sequel What a Feeling by Hughes Corporation in 2006, which is loosely based on dance sequences from Flashdance and Dirty Dancing. In 2008 he directed a music video for Katie Melua, in which he appears opposite his sister, María Victoria Di Pace. In 2009 he appeared on the videoclip "Time Is Running Out" by Muse.

In 2013, Di Pace was cast as series regular billionaire businessman Nicolas Treviño for season 3 of the TNT drama series Dallas. In 2016, Di Pace appears in a recurring role as Fernando, the fiancé and ex-husband of Kimmy Gibbler on the Netflix series Fuller House. Starting in the second season he was promoted to the main cast.

In 2018, he was announced as one of the celebrities to compete on season 27 of Dancing with the Stars, being paired with the professional dancer Cheryl Burke. Despite earning five perfect scores and holding the highest average of the season, they were eliminated in the semi-final in a double elimination with Joe Amabile and Jenna Johnson, and tied for fifth place.

Personal life
Di Pace came out publicly as gay in July 2019. Before this, he said of his sexuality, "Acceptance was my fuel, and when that is the case, like an addict, you do whatever it takes to get a fix. I figured if I changed my fucking self, I could be in."

Filmography

Film

Television

Theatre

Awards and nominations

References

External links 
 

Argentine male television actors
Living people
Argentine male soap opera actors
Argentine people of Italian descent
Male actors from Buenos Aires
Gay singers
Argentine LGBT singers
Argentine gay actors
Argentine gay musicians
21st-century Argentine male actors
People educated at a United World College
Participants in American reality television series
1979 births
20th-century Argentine LGBT people
21st-century Argentine LGBT people